Vápenná (until 1949 Zighartice) is a municipality and village in Jeseník District in the Olomouc Region of the Czech Republic. It has about 1,200 inhabitants.

Administrative parts
The hamlet of Polka is an administrative part of Vápenná.

History
The first written mention of Zighartice is from 1358. The village was abandoned in around 1420, but was resettled in 1576.

During the World War II, the German occupiers operated four forced labour subcamps of the Stalag VIII-B/344 prisoner-of-war camp at the local quarries.

In 1949, the municipality was renamed Vápenná.

Notable people
Emil Beier (1893–1985), Nazi German politician

References

External links

Villages in Jeseník District
Czech Silesia